Aldo Serena  (born 25 June 1960) is an Italian former professional footballer, who was usually deployed as a forward. He played for several Italian clubs throughout his career, winning four Serie A titles, among other trophies; he is mainly remembered for his time with Inter, where he won several trophies, including a league title and the UEFA Cup. At international level, he represented the Italy national team in the 1986 FIFA World Cup and the 1990 FIFA World Cup, helping the team to a third-place finish in the latter tournament.

He works as a pundit for Mediaset.

Club career
During his career, Serena played for a number of Italian clubs: Montebelluna, Inter, Como, Bari, A.C. Milan, Juventus and Torino. Born in Montebelluna, in the province of Treviso, he spent his youth playing with his hometown side's youth academy. After making his professional debut with the Montebelluna senior team in Serie D in 1977, and scoring nine goals in 29 appearances during his debut season, Serena first joined Inter the following season in 1978; he made his Serie A debut later that year, on 19 November, in a 4–0 home win over Lazio, marking the occasion with his first Serie A goal, and also making another league appearance later that the season. Although he initially won the 1981–82 Coppa Italia during his first spell with the club, he mainly served as a back-up, and was initially loaned out to several other Italian sides: he spent seasons on loan with Como, Bari, cross-city rivals Milan, and Torino. He also enjoyed a successful two-season spell with rivals Juventus between 1985 and 1987, scoring 21 Serie A goals in 51 appearances, as well as winning the 1985 Intercontinental Cup and the 1985–86 Serie A title; in total, he scored 36 goals in all competitions for the Turin side in 71 appearances. Serena enjoyed greater success after returning to Inter for his second spell in 1987. His best season with the Milan-side came during the 1988–89 campaign under manager Giovanni Trapattoni, when he won the Scudetto with Inter with a record 58 points (the club's thirteenth Serie A title overall), and was crowned top scorer of the league, scoring 22 goals. He also later won the 1989 Supercoppa Italiana and the 1990–91 UEFA Cup during his second spell with the club.

After his second move to local rivals Milan in 1991, Serena's reputation as an Inter legend was somewhat tarnished, however; this was shown recently when Serena's name was booed by some of Inter's Ultras supporters when it was announced that he was to be part of an Inter Legends gathering after the final game of the 2006–07 league trophy presentation. Although Serena's first spell with Milan saw him help the team win the Serie B title and achieve Serie A promotion in 1983, as he scored eight goals in 20 appearances, his second spell with Milan was less successful; despite winning another Supercoppa Italiana in 1992, and another two Serie A titles in 1992 and 1993 under manager Fabio Capello, he was used with less frequency due to several injury struggles, only making tenappearances over his two final seasons, and he failed to score in Serie A during his second spell with the club, ultimately retiring from professional football in 1993.

Serena and Christian Vieri (in 2005) are the only footballers to have played for both of the rival teams of Turin and Milan, and Serena is also one of six footballers to win the Serie A title with three clubs, a feat he managed with Juventus, Inter, and Milan; the others to have achieved the same feat are Giovanni Ferrari, Filippo Cavalli, Pietro Fanna, Sergio Gori and Attilio Lombardo.

International career
Serena played for the Azzurri in two World Cups, first in the 1986 FIFA World Cup and then in the 1990 FIFA World Cup on home soil, where Italy finished in third place, although he did not make a single appearance in the former tournament. Serena also played for the Italian under-23 side at the 1984 Summer Olympics, helping the team to a fourth-place finish. His senior international debut came in a 2–0 friendly win over Poland, in Pescara, on 8 December 1984, and he scored his first goal for Italy on 5 February 1986, in a 2–1 friendly win over West Germany in Avellino. In total he earned 24 caps and scored 5 goals for the senior Italian national team.

At the 1990 World Cup in Italy, Serena scored with a header on his 30th birthday in Italy's 2–0 round of 16 win over Uruguay on 25 June. In the semi-final match, he left the pitch in tears after he missed a crucial spot kick in the semi-final shoot-out against Argentina, with the goalkeeper Sergio Goycochea saving the ball to his left, a game the home nation lost on penalties following a 1–1 draw after extra-time. Serena later insisted that he did not want to take a penalty in the shootout, but that he was forced to be included as Italy's final penalty taker by manager Azeglio Vicini, as no one else had volunteered. Italy won the third place match against England 2–1, however, capturing the bronze medal. Serena made his final appearance for Italy on 22 December  1990, scoring two goals in a 4–0 win over Cyprus.

Style of play
Serena was a fit, strong, dedicated, hard-working, and athletic centre forward who excelled in the air; a former defensive midfielder and a basketball player in his youth, he was known in particular for his powerful and accurate heading ability, due to his height, strength, and elevation, as well as his positional sense, and his tenacious, intelligent, and physical style of play with his back to goal, which enabled him to shield the ball from defenders, create space in the area, anticipate opponents, and win aerial challenges, despite his lack of notable pace. He was also capable of finishing well with his powerful and accurate left footed shot. Although he was not particularly skilful from a technical standpoint, or particularly refined with his feet, he was able to improve his technique over his career. Primarily a striker who mainly operated in the penalty area, he was a versatile player, who was also capable of playing as a second striker or as a winger.

Honours
Juventus
Serie A: 1985–86
Intercontinental Cup: 1985

Inter
Serie A: 1988–89
Coppa Italia: 1981–82
Supercoppa Italiana: 1989
UEFA Cup: 1990–91

Milan
Serie A: 1991–92, 1992–93
Supercoppa Italiana: 1992

Italy
FIFA World Cup: third place 1990

Individual
Serie A Top Goal Scorer: 1988–89

Orders
 5th Class / Knight: Cavaliere Ordine al Merito della Repubblica Italiana: 1991

References

External links

Record for Italy

1960 births
Living people
People from Montebelluna
Association football forwards
Italian footballers
Italy international footballers
1986 FIFA World Cup players
1990 FIFA World Cup players
Serie A players
Serie B players
Serie D players
Inter Milan players
S.S.C. Bari players
A.C. Milan players
Juventus F.C. players
Torino F.C. players
Footballers at the 1984 Summer Olympics
Olympic footballers of Italy
Como 1907 players
Calcio Montebelluna players
UEFA Cup winning players
Knights of the Order of Merit of the Italian Republic
Sportspeople from the Province of Treviso
Footballers from Veneto